Rosa Papa Meilland is a cultivar of hybrid tea rose, bred by Alain Meilland in France in 1963.

Description 
Flowers of dark velvety crimson open from pointed, almost black, buds. The blossoms are large and high-centered, with 35 petals, and are borne mostly singly on strong stems. They have a rich scent. Flowering is very sustained over the summer to early autumn.

The foliage is glossy and bright green.

It is a vigorous rose, but not as disease-resistant as it once was.

Ancestry 
This cultivar is the result of the breeding 'Chrysler Imperial' x 'Charles Mallerin', both highly scented, velvety, rich-red roses.

It was the first cultivar of roses officially registered in France, under the name of "Meicesar". Alain Meilland named the rose in honor of his grandfather, rosarian, Antoine Meilland.

Distinctions 
 Rose Hall of Fame, 1988,
 Gold medal in Baden-Baden, 1962.

References 

Papa Meilland
1963 introductions